Immanuel Jarod McElroy (born March 25, 1980) is an American former professional basketball player. He played as a point guard-shooting guard and small forward.

College career
McElroy played college basketball at Tyler Junior College from 1998-00 and at the University of Cincinnati from 2000 to 2002.

Professional career
In his professional career, McElroy has played with: the Grand Rapids Hoops, Dodge City Legend, Gary Steelheads, RheinEnergie Cologne, ALBA Berlin.

McElroy began his career in the Continental Basketball Association (CBA) and was named the CBA Rookie of the Year with the Grand Rapids Hoops in 2003. He moved to the Gary Steelheads of the CBA the following season and was selected to the CBA All-Defensive Team in 2004.

While playing for ALBA Berlin McElroy won the Best Defensive Player award of the German League 5 times in a row, from 2007 till 2011. In July 2011 he signed a two-year contract with New Yorker Phantoms, later the Löwen Braunschweig.

References

External links
Euroleague.net Profile
Eurobasket.com Profile
ALBA Berlin Profile 

1980 births
Living people
Alba Berlin players
American expatriate basketball people in Germany
Basketball Löwen Braunschweig players
Basketball players from Texas
Cincinnati Bearcats men's basketball players
Grand Rapids Hoops players
Köln 99ers players
Point guards
Science City Jena players
Shooting guards
Sportspeople from Galveston, Texas
Tyler Apaches men's basketball players
American men's basketball players
United States Basketball League players